German submarine U-606 was a Type VIIC U-boat built for Nazi Germany's Kriegsmarine for service during World War II.
She was laid down on 12 March 1941 by Blohm & Voss, Hamburg as yard number 582, launched on 27 November 1941 and commissioned on 22 January 1942 under Oberleutnant zur See Hans Klatt.

Design
German Type VIIC submarines were preceded by the shorter Type VIIB submarines. U-606 had a displacement of  when at the surface and  while submerged. She had two shafts and two  propellers.

U-606 was fitted with five  torpedo tubes (four fitted at the bow and one at the stern), fourteen torpedoes, one  SK C/35 naval gun, 220 rounds, and a  C/30 anti-aircraft gun. The boat had a complement of between forty-four and sixty.

Service history
The boat's career began with training at 5th U-boat Flotilla on 22 January 1942, followed by active service on 1 September 1942 as part of the 11th Flotilla. After just two months, on 1 November 1942, she transferred to 9th Flotilla.

Convoy ON 166

Wolfpacks
U-606 took part in five wolfpacks, namely:
 Puma (26 – 29 October 1942)
 Natter (30 October – 8 November 1942)
 Kreuzotter (8 – 24 November 1942)
 Falke (8 – 19 January 1943)
 Haudegen (19 January – 15 February 1943)

Fate
U-606 was sunk on 22 February 1943 in the North Atlantic in position . Older publications claimed, that the Campbell also rammed U-606, but apparently some U-Boat had just collided with the Campbell, and it is not clear if it was U-606. There were 36 dead and 12 survivors (5 by the Campbell and 7 by the Burza). U-606 finally sunk on 23 February near dawn.

Summary of raiding history

References

Bibliography

External links

German Type VIIC submarines
1941 ships
U-boats commissioned in 1942
U-boats sunk in 1943
U-boats sunk by depth charges
U-boats sunk by US warships
U-boats sunk by Polish warships
World War II shipwrecks in the Atlantic Ocean
World War II submarines of Germany
Ships built in Hamburg
Maritime incidents in February 1943